Dineth Jayakody (born 2 February 2002) is a Sri Lankan cricketer. He made his Twenty20 debut on 4 March 2021, for Nondescripts Cricket Club in the 2020–21 SLC Twenty20 Tournament. He made his List A debut on 7 April 2021, for Nondescripts Cricket Club in the 2020–21 Major Clubs Limited Over Tournament.

References

External links
 

2002 births
Living people
Sri Lankan cricketers
Nondescripts Cricket Club cricketers
Place of birth missing (living people)